Bairols is a commune in the Alpes-Maritimes department in the Provence-Alpes-Côte d'Azur region of south-eastern France.

The inhabitants of the commune are known as Bairolois or Bairoloises.

The commune has been awarded two flowers by the National Council of Towns and Villages in Bloom in the Competition of cities and villages in Bloom.

Geography
Bairols is located at an altitude of 830 metres on a rocky ridge some 20 km north of Gilette and 5 km north of Villars-sur-Var. Access to the commune is by the M26 road from Tournefort in the south which passes through the south-eastern corner of the commune and connects with the tortuous M56 road which continues to the village. The commune is a rugged alpine commune.

The Tinée river forms the eastern border of the commune as it flows south to join the Var. Many tributaries rise in the commune and flow east to join the Tinée including the Vallon du Serre, the Ruisseau de Fava, the Vallon du Bairols, and the Ravin de Saint Martin.

History
The name Bairolum is cited around 1040. The village was then given to Lérins Abbey then became a fief of the Grimaldi.

The village was linked to the outside world by a motorable road in 1939. There were still 257 inhabitants in 1858.

Heraldry

Administration

List of Successive Mayors

Population

Sites and Monuments

Ruins of a Chateau
The Medieval Church of Sainte-Marguerite whose "S" form is due to the topography. Inside there are two frescoes in the choir on the theme of the Baptism of Christ. The church has a painting by Jean Rocca of the Virgin of the Rosary and Mysteries dated 1645. The church also contains a Group Sculpture on a Processional dais of Saint Marguerite and the Tarasque (18th century) which is registered as an historical object.
The Chapel of Saint Antoine above the village
The Chapel of Saint-Roch, above, built around 1750
Remains of the Chapel of Saint-Martin
Two former oil and grain mills
The remains of the old village below the present village.

See also
Communes of the Alpes-Maritimes department

References

Bibliography
Philippe de Beauchamp, The misunderstood High Country. Isolated Villages and Hamlets of Alpes-Marities, p. 81, éditions Serre, Nice, 1989, ; p. 159 

Communes of Alpes-Maritimes